Thrussington is a village and civil parish in the Charnwood district of Leicestershire, England. The population of the civil parish at the 2011 census was 587. It is on the River Wreake, near to Rearsby, Ratcliffe on the Wreake, Hoby and Brooksby, and not far from the path of the Fosse Way.

Toponymy
The place-name 'Thrussington' is first attested in the Domesday Book of 1086, where it appears as Turstanetone. It appears as Tursteineston in the Pipe Rolls of 1175. The name means 'Thursten's town or settlement'.

Events
The village boasts several annual events, including the Thrussington Fun Run, Skittles on The Green, and various social and fund–raising events (most of which raise money for the local school, church, or village hall).
According to the Thrussington Parish council web site Thrussington is a small village which originated as a Danish settlement on the western side of the River Wreake.
The village is a thriving community of approximately 550 residents, and has a school, hairdresser and two public houses. The village church is Holy Trinity and is of Norman origin.
The village seems to have been shared, in political and historical terms, between the Lords of Loughborough and Melton, as there is no record of a "Lord of the Manor". In the 19th century, Sir Harry Goodrick, Bart., was a patron of the sports of cockfighting, boxing, and hunting with hounds.

John Marius Wilson's Imperial Gazetteer of England and Wales described Thrussington:
"THRUSSINGTON, a parish, with a village, in Barrow-upon-Soar district, Leicester; on the river Wreak, ½ a mile N of Rearsby r. station, and 7½ WSW of Melton-Mowbray. It has a post-office under Leicester. Acres, 2,200. Real property, £4,113. Pop., 574. Houses, 136. The manor is divided among four. The living is a vicarage in the diocese of Peterborough. Value, £240. Patron, Mrs. Bishop. The church was repaired in 1836. There are three dissenting chapels, a slightly endowed school, and charities £11."
The Anglican church is dedicated to The Holy Trinity and seats 250. It was built in the 14th century, substantially repaired in 1836, and further restored in 1877, including the tower.

The village has had some success in promoting its "in bloom" image.

Population
The Parish of Thrussington has a population of around 500 people.

Transport
Thrussington is situated 1 mile East of the A46 giving easy access by car to both Leicester and Nottingham.

World Wars
A cenotaph on Thrussington's Village Green honours the citizens of the village who served their country in military service during the twentieth century's wars.

References

External links

Villages in Leicestershire
Civil parishes in Leicestershire
Borough of Charnwood